Clinton Duodu (born 20 June 2005) is a Ghanaian professional footballer who plays as forward for Ghanaian Premier League side Bechem United F.C.

Career 
Duodu started his professional career with Bechem United and was promoted to the senior team in August 2020 ahead of the 2020–21 season. On 11 November 2020, during the first match of the season he was named on the bench for the match against Liberty Professionals. He however made his debut the following week at the age of 15 years, during match day 2 after coming on in the 62nd minute for Emmanuel Boakye Owusu in a 1–0 victory West African Football Academy (WAFA). He made his first full debut on 18 December 2020 against Karela United, and created the assist to Steven Owusu's goal in the 46th minute. The match subsequently ended in a 2–1 victory for Bechem. On 7 February 2021, he scored his debut goal after converting a penalty in the 13th minute in 3–1 victory over Accra Great Olympics.

References

External links 

 

Living people
2005 births
Association football forwards
Ghanaian footballers
Bechem United F.C. players
Ghana Premier League players